Pattinapakkam is a 2018 Indian Tamil-language thriller film written and directed by Jayadev. The film stars Kalaiyarasan and Anaswara Kumar in the leading roles, with Chaya Singh and John Vijay in supporting roles. Featuring music composed by Ishaan Dev, the film which began production in 2015 and met with a couple of unexpected delays, finally managed to release in theatres on 23 November 2018.

Cast 

Kalaiyarasan as Vetri
Anaswara Kumar as Mithra
Chaya Singh as Sheeba
Manoj K. Jayan as James Thomas
Yog Japee as Sathya
John Vijay as Samuthiram
R. Sundarrajan
Charle
M. S. Bhaskar as Thee Thangavel
Madhan Bob
Jangiri Madhumitha
Swaminathan
Rosin Jolly as Malinie

Production 
Newcomer director Jayadev, the brother of actress Bhavana, began scripting for the film in mid-2013 and met industry professionals in both Chennai and Kerala to develop his script. After spending over a year meeting potential actors and producers, Jayadev met Kalaiyarasan in Chennai during August 2014 to discuss the film and after hearing the concept and storyline, Kalaiyarasan showed interest to work in the project. Jayadev reworked the screenplay and pre-production began in May 2015, with the team fixing the filming dates for August 2015. Anaswara Kumar was signed on to play the lead female role. Speaking about her role, Anaswara revealed that she would portray a college student who hails from a middle-class background, who is extremely protective of Vetri (played by Kalaiyarasan)". Chaya Singh revealed that she would be portraying a Bollywood actress, while Kalaiyarasan would play her mother's carer.

However the film later was delayed twice, firstly as a result of Kalaiyarasan signing on to appear in Kabali  and then as a result of the 2015 South Indian floods. Principal photography began on 15 December 2015 and after a schedule break, the second schedule started in February and the production was wrapped up on 28 August 2016. The film was shot entirely in and around the city of Chennai. Editing and other post production works were later completed by July 2016, with sound mixing completed at Prasad Studios by audiographer Krishnamoorthy and grading was done at Prism and Pixels by Nandhakumar.

Music 
The songs and BGM are composed by Ishaan Dev and Lyrics by Murugan Manthiram & Velmurugan.
"Chennai Enga Ooru" – Ishaan Dev
"Anbe Endhan" – Adheef, Akhila Anand
"Adra Dolakku" – Anthony Daasan, Jassie Gift
"Neramthaan Vandhathe" – Abhay Jodhpurkar

Critical reception 
The film received negative reviews from critics. Cinema Express wrote "The film tries to be a lot of things at the same time. It starts off as a murder mystery and quickly slips into the family-drama genre, while trying hard to be a comedy intermittently. This lack of clarity in the writing and the sloppy execution makes Pattinapakkam a hard film to sit through." Times of India wrote "With hardly any convincing sequence, the whole set up looks staged and amateurish to the core. We do not sympathise with any of the characters which seem to suffer on screen and there is no curiosity factor throughout the movie."

References

External links 
 

2010s mystery thriller films
2010s Tamil-language films
2018 directorial debut films
2018 films
2018 thriller drama films
Hyperlink films
Indian mystery thriller films
Indian thriller drama films
Tamil remakes of Malayalam films